The Portuguese manual alphabet is the manual alphabet used in Portuguese Sign Language. Compared to other manual alphabets based on the Latin alphabet, it has unusual forms for many of its letters.

Letters

See also
  Fingerspelling

Manual alphabet
Latin-script representations